Jakob Stämpfli (23 February 1820 – 15 May 1879) was a Swiss politician and member of the Swiss Federal Council (1854–1863).

He was elected to the Federal Council of Switzerland on 6 December 1854, and handed over office on 31 December 1863. He was affiliated with the Free Democratic Party of Switzerland. 

During his time in office he held the following departments:
Department of Justice and Police (1855)
Political Department as President of the Confederation (1856)
Department of Finance (1857–1858)
Political Department as President of the Confederation (1859)
Military Department (1860–1861)
Political Department as President of the Confederation (1862)
Military Department (1863)

Jakob Stämpfli was also member of the international tribunal that had to decide on the Alabama Claims in 1871.

References

External links

1820 births
1879 deaths
People from Seeland District
Swiss Calvinist and Reformed Christians
Free Democratic Party of Switzerland politicians
Foreign ministers of Switzerland
Finance ministers of Switzerland
Members of the Federal Council (Switzerland)
Members of the Council of States (Switzerland)
Members of the National Council (Switzerland)
Presidents of the National Council (Switzerland)
Federal Supreme Court of Switzerland judges
19th-century Swiss politicians
19th-century Swiss judges
University of Bern alumni